David Gary Crowton (born June 14, 1957) is an American football coach. He served as the head football coach at Louisiana Tech University from 1996 to 1998 and at Brigham Young University (BYU) from 2001 to 2004, compiling a career college football coaching record of 47–36.

Crowton has also served as offensive coordinator at the University of Maryland, at the University of Oregon, for the Chicago Bears of the National Football League (NFL), and at Louisiana State University (LSU). He was the offensive coordinator for the 2007 LSU Tigers football team, which won the 2008 BCS National Championship Game and a consensus national championship. While at Oregon, Crowton was a 2005 finalist for the Broyles Award, given annually to the nation's top college football assistant coach. Crowton is most known for his aggressive offensive style, such as the "razzle dazzle" offensive scheme utilized in Chicago. He was nicknamed "The Wizard" by the LSU players, after completing 39 games with an accomplishment of at least 30 points within 25 games and a 25–10 overall mark.

Coaching career
Crowton succeeded longtime coach LaVell Edwards as head coach of BYU in 2001. In his first season, he led the Cougars to a 12–2 record, their most wins since going 14–1 in 1996. However, the Cougars won only 14 more games in the next three years. By comparison, Edwards had suffered only two non-winning seasons in 29 years. He was forced to resign after the 2004 season.

In 2018, Crowton was hired as the offensive coordinator at Pine View High School in St. George, Utah.

Education and family
Crowton graduated from Orem High School in 1975 and went on to earn a B.S. in physical education from Brigham Young University in 1983. He and his wife, Maren, have four daughters and three sons. Crowton made an appearance in the Mormon pop culture film The R.M.

Head coaching record

References

External links
 Stephen F. Austin profile
 LSU profile
 Oregon profile

1957 births
Living people
BYU Cougars football coaches
Chicago Bears coaches
Georgia Tech Yellow Jackets football coaches
Louisiana Tech Bulldogs football coaches
LSU Tigers football coaches
Maryland Terrapins football coaches
New Hampshire Wildcats football coaches
Oregon Ducks football coaches
Oregon State Beavers football coaches
Snow Badgers football coaches
Southern Utah Thunderbirds football coaches
Stephen F. Austin Lumberjacks football coaches
Western Illinois Leathernecks football coaches
Winnipeg Blue Bombers coaches
High school football coaches in Utah
Brigham Young University alumni
Sportspeople from Orem, Utah
Coaches of American football from Utah
Latter Day Saints from Utah